Société Air Alpes was a French airline company headquartered in Chambéry Airport and in Viviers-du-Lac, Savoie, near Chambéry. Established in 1961 by Michel Ziegler, the airline's history began in the French Alps.

History

1960s
Air Alpes was founded in 1961 by Michel Ziegler, with its registered office at Chambéry Airport. He received backing from Henri Ziegler and Sylvain Floirat, who became the two first shareholders; followed later on by Joseph Szydlowski, the founder of aircraft engine manufacturer Turbomeca. Due to the construction of new facilities at Chambéry Airport, the registered office was transferred to Courchevel Airport. Operations were initially with a Piper PA-18 Super Cub, mainly offering flying lessons and carrying supplies into the mountains. A PC-6/340 Porter was leased, but on September 2, 1961, it was destroyed during a training flight at the "Col du Dome" in the Mont Blanc mountains. In 1962, a replacement turboprop Pilatus PC-6/A-H2 Porter was acquired.

Glacier skiing drop-offs were very important during the first years of Air Alpes' operation. The company built its own airstrips, called altiports at various high-altitude locations. Landings could only be achieved with guidance from the ground. A very close cooperation was established between the company and ski-instructors and guides from the various ski-resorts. The main glaciers of Mont Blanc, the Tarentaise Valley, the Vanoise massif and Oisans were now accessible. For each flight only a maximum of six customers and their guide could be accommodated. This activity ended in 1979 after a ban on glacier landings was imposed. In 1963, a second Pilatus PC-6/A-H2 joined the fleet and the company built an altiport at La Plagne. The first domestic seasonal routes were operated in Corsica. In 1964, Megève Aerodrome was inaugurated on December 20. In November, a six-seat SFERMA SF-60 Marquis was leased for flights to Lyon Bron Airport.

In 1967 an order was completed for the first de Havilland Canada DHC-6 Twin Otters with first deliveries scheduled for October. The Twin Otter allowed winter operations into the Courchevel Altiport as they could be equipped with skis. The Twin Otters were also used on Chambéry – Grenoble – Nice – Ajaccio services during the summer months.

In 1968 it was becoming apparent many smaller provincial towns wished to be connected directly to Paris by air. Among some of the smaller regional airlines that begun to fill this need were Rousseau Aviation, Touraine Air Transport (TAT), Air Paris and EAS – Europe Air Services. The French regional air transport sector would eventually comprise as many as 50 regional airlines, operating on 100 regular or seasonal routes. During this period these airlines carried more than 500,000 passengers. In 1969, Air Alpes began flying the Chambéry to Paris – Le Bourget Airport  route with five daily flights Monday through Friday. Also in 1969, the first Beechcraft Model 99 15-seat turboprop joined the fleet. In 1970 Ziegler was prominent in establishing the Regional Air Transport Association (ATAR). The association comprised the airlines Air Alpes, Air Alsace, Air Aquitaine, Air Languedoc, Pyrenair, Air Rouergue, Air Antilles, Air Martinique and Guyane Air Transport; and promoted the needs of its members in relation to the larger flag carriers such as Air France.

1970s
In April 1971 a Yakovlev Yak-40 was demonstrated to the airline, but no jets joined the fleet until 1974. In 1972 Air Alpes purchased 30% of Avi ALPI, an Italian air transport company based in Trento Northern Italy using a fleet of Piper and Pilatus light aircraft. Avi ALPI had been created by Aerosud and famed World War II pilot Martino Aichner. The same year saw operations commence on the Dole–Paris, and Paris/Geneva – Courchevel routes with Twin Otters. From 1972 Air Alpes was hosted on the Air France reservation system. The same year the GIECAR group (Groupement d'Intérêt Économique des Compagnies Aériennes Régionales) was created, leading to greater integration with Air France when agreements were forged to form a partnership between Air Limousin, Air Champagne Ardennes and Pyrenair, all flying on behalf of Air France. Courchevel–Paris, Courchevel–Geneva, Marseille–Milan, Marseille–Geneva, Marseille–Barcelonne, Marseille–Geneva and Metz–Düsseldorf services were operated using Air France-branded aircraft. By the end of 1973 Air Alpes was flying 50 routes; including Air France/Air Alpes routes and flights jointly marketed by the two airlines. Further agreements with other larger airlines such as Union des Transports Aériens for the Savoie and Haute-Savoie regions and Pan American World Airways were also made.

The association with Air France prompted the decision to place orders for four Aérospatiale Corvette short range business- and regional jets, with options for eight more; and in 1974 Air Alpes entered the jet age with the arrival of the first Corvette; operations commenced on September 28 flying in the full colors of Air France upon the Chambéry–Paris route. Also in 1974 Air Alpes acquired Air Champagne Ardennes soon after the takeover of Air Limousin, Air Rouergue and Pyrénair. The number of aircraft continued to increase with the arrival of a Cessna 401, a Cessna 402 and a Cessna 411 with the takeover of these companies. In October 1975 the first of two Fokker F27 Friendship turboprops arrived. The first F27 route was Chambéry to Paris, the same route initiated by the Corvettes a year earlier.

In 1976 Air Alpes unveiled a new logo for its aircraft and the company. While the majority of the stock remained in the hands of the Ziegler family and Mr. Sylvain Floirat, two new shareholders took part ownership, the chambers of commerce and industry of Savoie and Haute Savoie. By 1977 operating the Corvettes proved not to be financially viable for Air Alpes and the four aircraft were withdrawn from the fleet. The added financing by the Chamber of Commerce groups was insufficient and the group TAG Techniques d'Avant Garde became the main shareholder of Air Alpes, with a recovery package put into place after the realization that a number of routes were not profitable. Additional recovery plans led to operations ceasing on several routes, including Chambéry – Grenoble – St. Etienne – Toulouse and Grenoble-Metz; along with the cancellation of a contract for Air Inter to perform major maintenance/overhaul of the Fokker F27s flown by Air Alpes.

In April 1979 the first of a fleet of Fokker F28 Fellowship twinjets arrived. The Fokker F28, equipped with 65 seats, replaced the F27s on the Chambéry to Paris route. Air Alpes also inaugurated the Paris to Figari Southern Corsica route with the delivery of two more F28s which followed a short time later. The F28 fleet complemented the F27s and this fleet continued to grow during 1980 as more F27s and a Fairchild Hiller FH-227 were delivered.

1980s
On July 3, 1980, an agreement was signed with TAT for the two companies to share sales, office functions and services. The agreement led to reductions in the F28 and F27 fleet, while two McDonnell Douglas DC-9s were leased the following year. In 1981 TAT acquired over 75% of Air Alpes' shares and the company subsequently ceased operations.

Incidents and accidents
 2 September 1961, Pilatus destroyed during a training flight.

 15 January 1970, Beech 99 F-BRUF lands short of the runway at Chambéry- Aix-les-Bains Airport. All passengers and crew were safe, and sound but the aircraft was destroyed. Following this accident, the Chambéry-Aix-les-Bains airport (Chambéry Airport) will be equipped with an ILS (Instrument Landing System) to allow the security and reliability of the flights. This had been requested by Air Alpes previously for a long time.

 1970, A DHC-6 Twin Otter is damaged during a training flight at the Courchevel Altiport

References

 Air Alpes and the Association Amicales des Anciens d'Air Alpes Archives
 Les Ailes (year 1962)
 Aviation Magazine (from 1962 to 1981)
 Air et Cosmos (from 1964 and 1981)
 Air Britain News (1972 to 1981)
 Le Trait d'Union (French Branch from Air-Britain)
 Newspaper "Le Dauphine Libéré"
 Newspaper "Le Progrés"

External links

 Ties with: Association des Anciens d'Air Alpes: https://web.archive.org/web/20071215015134/http://www.airalpes.com/
 To know the evolution of the Alpes aviation http://www.aeroclub-meribel.com/ (History thumb-index/The Alpes and the aircraft)
 To find old schedules: http://www.timetableimages.com/ttimages/lp.htm
 Links for Air Limousin blogs: https://web.archive.org/web/20080419191226/http://blogs.aol.fr/airpassion87/airlimousin/

Defunct airlines of France
Airlines established in 1961
Airlines disestablished in 1981